Lazlo Woodbine is a fictional character in some of Robert Rankin's novels. He is generally portrayed as a metafictional character, being in the novels themselves the creation of mystery writer P.P. Penrose and described by himself as the last of the nineteen-fifties private detectives.

Physical Appearance
Throughout his appearances, Lazlo Woodbine has never been specifically described barring his traditional attire of a trenchcoat and fedora, with all his stories being narrated in the first person. According to the character himself, this lack of description allows readers to picture Lazlo as anyone they care to imagine, thus imposing their own face or that of their hero onto Woodbine, and allowing them to feel more like they are part of the story.

Lazlo's Rules
In any Lazlo Woodbine story, Lazlo commonly begins his appearance by explaining that he goes through the novel in his trenchcoat and fedora, armed with his trusty Smith & Wesson (whose name is constantly mispronounced for no apparent reason other than a desire to do so), and only ever works four locations, regarding these four as the maximum number that a truly great private detective requires. These locations are:
 Lazlo's office, where he is hired by his clients;
 Fangio's bar, where he talks toot with Fangio the fat barman and is subsequently knocked on the head by the dame that does him wrong;
 An alleyway, where Lazlo gets into sticky situations that involve him having to shoot somebody;
 The final rooftop showdown, where, after a climatic confrontation, Lazlo sends the villain plunging to oblivion in the final chapter.

Throughout the novels, Lazlo avoids explicitly describing any of these four settings, thus allowing him to use them for multiple locations, such as arguing that any occasions where he is in an office feature him being inside his office as they all look alike. However, in any of Rankin's novel where he plays a long-term role, Lazlo commonly finds his way around his four-set rule to move from location to location, such as closing his eyes while travelling from the alley to the rooftop – thus avoiding actually seeing anything, and hence not breaking the rule – or assuming another persona altogether to account for the travel time. The only occasion where Woodbine has clearly violated his four-set-rule was in Armageddon III, when he briefly shared a bedroom with Rex Mundi and a two-headed baby that had been abducted and experimented on by aliens.

According to Woodbine, when reading one of his novels the reader can always expect a lot of gratuitous sex and violence, a trail of corpses, no small degree of name mispronunciation – characters commonly pronounce his name wrong, calling him everything from Woodlouse to Woodstock – and enough trenchcoat humour and ludicrous catchphrases to carry you through a month of rainy Thursdays. (Although some novels point out that the sex would be difficult given that Woodbine's four scenes lack a bedroom.)

"Metafictional" Status
Unlike most characters in Robert Rankin's work, who appear at inconsistent times and places but are nevertheless consistently the same person, Lazlo Woodbine's status as a real person is often questionable, with most of his appearances explicitly referring to his status as a character in fiction, and his appearance in the novel being simply an artificial creation (The Dance of the Voodoo Handbag) or simply the result of an individual suffering from delusions (Waiting for Godalming). Only in The Suburban Book of the Dead (Armageddon III: The Remake) has Lazlo Woodbine explicitly appeared as a real person, and even then he came from an alternate future and travelled back into the past to investigate a case (aided by Barry the Time Sprout).

List of Appearances
To date, Lazlo Woodbine – or some variation of him – has appeared in the following novels;
 The Suburban Book of the Dead (Armageddon III: The Remake) (working alongside Rex Mundi and Barry the Time Sprout
 The Dance of the Voodoo Handbag (appears as a fictional character in a VR simulation that the main character is trapped in; results in some brief confusion as both characters are attempting to simultaneously write the story in the first person until they agree to allow Lazlo to do so)
 Waiting for Godalming (revealed over the course of the novel to be the 'barking mad' brother to the novel's main character of Icarus Smith, although Woodbine passes off his temporary assumption of the idiot brother identity as a means of allowing him to travel through the streets to the building where the final rooftop showdown will take place)
 Fandom of the Operator (The "real" Lazlo Woodbine briefly appears in the afterlife, complaining about his fictional namesake's treatment by the author)
 The Brightonomicon (Rizla – later revealed to be Jim Pooley of The Brentford Trilogy – dresses as Lazlo to tackle The Curious Case of the Woodingdean Chameleon in Hugo Rune's absence)
 Necrophenia (Lazlo takes centre stage in the 30th novel by Robert Rankin, although by means of the assumed identity device used in previous novels. The real LB does make a cameo appearance though.)

Fictional private investigators